Holcombe is a village in Ramsbottom ward, Metropolitan Borough of Bury, in Greater Manchester, England. It is situated south of Haslingden, east of Edgworth, west of Ramsbottom, and north of Tottington. The name comes from the Celtic  meaning valley, and the Old English , meaning deep or hollow.

The village is located on the slopes of Holcombe Moor.  Much of the moorland around the village is in the care of the National Trust and is popular with walkers, cyclists and bird watchers. The buildings in the area are made up predominantly  of stone cottages and farms. There is a public house called the Shoulder of Mutton, a restaurant, church, and primary school.  At one time the village also had a shop, post office, a lock-up, and a regular bus service linking it to Holcombe Brook, a neighbouring village in the valley bottom one mile to the south.

Holcombe is the home of the Holcombe Hunt. This pack of Harrier's, which has been kennelled at Holcombe for over 200 years, is one of the oldest in the country. The Hunt was granted a Coat of Arms in 1985 the motto being  "Hunting and conserving". Holcombe also gives its name to an Annual Gamecock Show, held on New Year's Day in Ramsbottom.  Since 1973 Holcombe has been home to Darul Uloom Al-Arabiyyah Al-Islamiyyah, the first Islamic Darul uloom school of higher-education in the United Kingdom.

Local radio station
Holcombe Brook and Holcombe Village are served by local community radio station "TOWER FM" 
107.4fm".

History

During the Middle Ages Holcombe hosted the regular court sessions of the Royal Manor of Tottington.

In 1617 the Holcombe Pack was taken to Hoghton Tower on the occasion of the King James I visit, when he granted the Royal Warrant to hunt over 12 townships, and the privilege of wearing the scarlet livery of the King.

During the evening of 25 September 1916, Holcombe was subjected to one of the first aerial offensives in history. L21, a Zeppelin commanded by Oberleutnant Kurt Frankenburg of the Imperial German Navy, dropped five bombs on the village on its way to Bolton. The post office and village school were damaged, as was the Shoulder of Mutton public house, where villagers took cover in the cellars. Three of the bombs fell close to the church, which suffered some damage to its windows.

In the 1980s and 1990s the television series The Krypton Factor used the British Army Rifle Range training course at Holcombe Moor in one of its contestant rounds.

See also
Darul Uloom Bury

References
Notes

Bibliography

External links

Summerseat Views is a resident's blog which aims to provide a photographic diary of life and the seasons in the village and the surrounding area.

Villages in Greater Manchester
West Pennine Moors
Geography of the Metropolitan Borough of Bury
Ramsbottom